Zaigrayevsky District (Zagarain aimag) is an administrative and municipal district (raion), one of the twenty-one in the Republic of Buryatia, Russia. It is located in the center of the republic. Its administrative center is the urban locality (an urban-type settlement) of Zaigrayevo. As of the 2010 Census, the total population of the district was 49,975, with the population of Zaigrayevo accounting for 11.2% of that number.

History
The district was established on February 11, 1935.

Administrative and municipal status
Within the framework of administrative divisions, Zaigrayevsky District is one of the twenty-one in the Republic of Buryatia. It is divided into two urban-type settlements (administrative divisions with the administrative centers, correspondingly, in the urban-type settlements (inhabited localities) of Zaigrayevo and Onokhoy), ten selsoviets, and one somon, all of which comprise forty-three rural localities. As a municipal division, the district is incorporated as Zaigrayevsky Municipal District. Zaigrayevo Urban-Type Settlement is incorporated as an urban settlement within the municipal district. The other urban settlement (Onokhoy Urban Settlement) within the municipal district incorporates the urban-type settlement of Onokhoy with the selo of Todogto and two rural localities in Dabatuysky Somon (the selo of Stary Onokhoy and the ulus of Onokhoy-Shibir). The remaining rural localities in Dabatuysky Somon and the ten selsoviets are incorporated as seventeen rural settlements within the municipal district. The urban-type settlement of Zaigrayevo serves as the administrative center of both the administrative and municipal district.

References

Notes

Sources

Districts of Buryatia
States and territories established in 1935